FC Khimik Suzak is a Kyrgyzstani football club based in Suzak, Kyrgyzstan that played in the top division in Kyrgyzstan, the Kyrgyzstan League.

History 
19??: Founded as FC Khimik Suzak.

Achievements 
Kyrgyzstan League:
8th place, Zone B: 1995

Kyrgyzstan Cup:

Current squad

External links 

Football clubs in Kyrgyzstan